Johann August Wilhelm Neander (January 17, 1789 July 14,1850) was a German theologian and church historian.

Biography
Neander was born in Göttingen as David Mendel. His father, Emmanuel Mendel, was said to have been a Jewish peddler, but August adopted the name of Neander on his baptism as a Protestant Christian. While very young, he moved with his mother to Hamburg. After completing grammar school (Johanneum), he enrolled in a gymnasium where the study of Plato enthralled him. Some of his early attachments include Wilhelm Neumann, writer Karl August Varnhagen von Ense, and the poet Adelbert von Chamisso.

Baptized on February 25,1806, Neander went to Halle to study divinity at the age of 17 where he studied under Friedrich Schleiermacher. Before the end of that year, the events of the War of the Fourth Coalition forced Neander to move to Göttingen where he continued his studies, made himself an expert on Plato and Plutarch, and became especially advanced in theology under GJ Planck. The impulse communicated by Schleiermacher was confirmed by Planck and Neander seems now to have realized that the original investigation of Christian history was to form the great work of his life.

Having finished his university course, he returned to Hamburg and passed his examination for the Christian ministry. However, after an interval of approximately eighteen months, he decided on an academic career at Heidelberg where two vacancies had occurred in the theological faculty of the university. He became a teacher of theology in 1811 and became a professor in 1812. In the same year, he published his monograph, Über den Kaiser Julianus und sein Zeitalter. The fresh insight into the history of the church evinced by this work drew attention to its author. Even before he had terminated the first year of his academical labours at Heidelberg, he was called to Berlin, where he was appointed Professor of Theology. His pupils included Edmond de Pressensé.

In the year following his appointment, he published a second monograph, Der Heilige Bernhard und sein Zeitalter (Berlin, 1813), and a third in 1818 which was his work on Gnosticism (Genetische Entwickelung der vornehmsten gnostischen Systeme). A still more extended and elaborate monograph followed in 1822, Der Heilige Johannes Chrysostomus und die Kirche besonders des Orients in dessen Zeitalter, and in 1824, another on Tertullian (Antignostikus). 

Neander had in the meantime begun his great work, to which these efforts were only preparatory studies. He published the first volume of Allgemeine Geschichte der christlichen Religion und Kirche in 1825. The other volumes followed at intervals—the fifth, which he published in 1842, bringing down the narrative to the pontificate of Boniface VIII. A posthumous volume edited by CFT Schneider in 1852, carried it on to the period of the council of Basel.

Aside from this work, Neander published Geschichte der Pflanzung und Leitung der christlichen Kirche durch die Apostel in 1832, and Das Leben Jesu Christi, in seinem geschichilichen Zusammenhang und seiner geschichtlichen Entwickelung in 1837, called forth by the famous Das Leben Jesu of David Strauss. In addition to all these, Neander published Denkwürdigkeiten aus der Geschichte des Christentums (1823-1824, 2 vols., 1825, 3 vols., 1846); Das Eine und Mannichfaltige des christlichen Lebens (1840); papers on Plotinus, Thomas Aquinas, Theobald Thamer, Blaise Pascal, John Henry Newman, Blanco White and Thomas Arnold, and other occasional pieces (Kleine Gelegenheitsschriften, 1829), mainly of a practical, exegetical and historical character. Several of his books went through multiple editions and were translated into English.

Neander died in Berlin on July 14,1850, worn out and nearly blind due to his incessant study. His grave is preserved in the Protestant Friedhof I der Jerusalems- und Neuen Kirchengemeinde (Cemetery No. I of the congregations of Jerusalem's Church and New Church) in Berlin-Kreuzberg, south of Hallesches Tor. After his death, a succession of volumes representing his various courses of lectures appeared (1856–1864), in addition to the Lectures on the History of Dogma (Theologische Vorlesungen), admirable in spirit and execution, which were edited by J. L. Jacobi in 1857.

Personal influences

People 
Neander's personal influences included his own family. His father did not have a positive influence in young Neander's life. Shortly after Neander's birth, his mother Esther divorced her husband and moved the whole family to Hamburg. She struggled on a daily basis to support her children. As a result, the family experienced a great deal of poverty. However, Neander cherished this period in his life and described it in endearing terms as “men in all ages who…have been indebted to their pious mothers” for planting the seeds of faith in their hearts. 

This period in Neander's life had a profound effect on both his personal faith and his attitude towards life in general. Neander was often described as ‘wide-hearted’, ‘truthful’, ‘sincere’, ‘free from all the stuff of vanity’, ‘affectionate’, ‘innocent and pure of heart’. These personal qualities can be attributed to his mother's influence. To what degree these influences affected the writings of Neander has not yet been established in the literature.

Neander felt indebted to his teacher and later his friend and colleague Schleiermacher, of whom similar sentiments are evident in his perceived purpose of recording church history. “To exhibit the history of the church of Christ, as a living witness of the divine power of Christianity; as a school of Christian experience; a voice, a sounding through the ages, of instruction, of doctrine, and of reproof, for all who are disposed to listen.”Schleiermacher's attitude towards history influenced that of his student and colleague which in turn  also influenced Neander's work.

Conversion from Judaism to Christianity 

The conversion of Augustus Neander from Judaism to Christianity was the largest change in his life and had a heavy impact upon both himself and his writing. Neander, along with his brothers and sisters, followed later by their mother, eventually left the synagogue and embraced Christianity. In his own personal conversion, Neander was influenced by the Apostle John, due to the similarity in the sentiment of John's writings to those of Plato.

Neander's conversion has often been likened to the conversion of Saint Paul of Tarsus. His conversion had a profound impact on his work and gave rise to an incredible conviction of the importance of faith. The impact that it had on both his person and his work was evident in his faith, his relationship with his students, and his attitude toward church history.

Church history 
The General History of the Christian Religion and Church (Allgemeine Geschichte der christlichen Religion und Kirche) was Neander's principal work. The history contrasted each ecclesiastical era with Neander's own. He believed that each age of history had representative tendencies which affected church practices, but that these tendencies were affected by human nature. His guiding principle in dealing both with history and with the present condition of the church was "that Christianity has room for the various tendencies of human nature, and aims at permeating and glorifying them all; that according to the divine plan these various tendencies are to occur successively and simultaneously and to counterbalance each other, so that the freedom and variety of the development of the spiritual life ought not to be forced into a single dogmatic form" (Otto Pfleiderer).

References

External links
Works Archive.org

1789 births
1850 deaths
19th-century German Protestant theologians
German historians of religion
Historians of Christianity
Christian Hebraists
German people of Jewish descent
German Protestants
Academic staff of Heidelberg University
Academic staff of the Humboldt University of Berlin
University of Halle alumni
Writers from Göttingen
People from the Electorate of Hanover
Writers from Hamburg
German male non-fiction writers
19th-century male writers
Messianic Jews